This is a list of Dutch television related events from 1996.

Events
3 March - Maxine & Franklin Brown are selected to represent Netherlands at the 1996 Eurovision Song Contest with their song "De eerste keer". They are selected to be the thirty-eighth Dutch Eurovision entry during Nationaal Songfestival held at Cinevideo Studio in Almere.
Unknown - Edsilia Rombley wins the twelfth series of Soundmixshow, performing as Oleta Adams.

Debuts
11 March - Goudkust (1996-2001)

Television shows

1950s
NOS Journaal (1956–present)

1970s
Sesamstraat (1976–present)

1980s
Jeugdjournaal (1981–present)
Soundmixshow (1985-2002)
Het Klokhuis (1988–present)

1990s
Goede tijden, slechte tijden (1990–present)

Ending this year

Births

Deaths